The 2019–20 season was ŠK Slovan Bratislava's 14th consecutive in the top flight of Slovak football.

Having won the 2018–19 Slovak First Football League, Slovan contested in the UEFA Champions League, but were eliminated in the first qualifying round. Subsequently, Slovan competed in the UEFA Europa League and reached the group stage.

Slovan were successful in their defence of the Slovak Super Liga clinching the title on 20 June. The club completed the domestic double on 8 July by winning the Slovak Cup.

The season covers the period from 1 June 2019 to July 2020.

Players

As of 11 July 2020

Transfers and loans

Transfers in

Loans in

Transfers out

Loans out

Friendlies

Pre-season

Mid-season

On-season

Competition overview

Fortuna liga

League table

Regular stage

Championship group
The championship group was originally supposed to have 10 rounds starting on 14 March 2020. Due to the coronavirus pandemic, all matches were postponed at first, and on 22 May 2020, the league committee approved a five-round model and created a new schedule.

Results summary

Results by matchday

Matches

Slovak Cup

UEFA Champions League

First qualifying round

UEFA Europa League

Second qualifying round

Third qualifying round

Play-off round

Group stage

Results by matchday

Matches

Statistics

Appearances

Goalscorers

Clean sheets

Disciplinary record

Attendances

Awards

Fortuna liga Player of the Month

Fortuna liga Goal of the Month

Fortuna liga Team of the Season

Fortuna liga Player of the Season

Fortuna liga Manager of the Season

Fortuna liga Top Scorer of the Season

Notes

References

ŠK Slovan Bratislava seasons
ŠK Slovan Bratislava season
Slovan Bratislava
Slovan Bratislava